Andropogon leucostachyus is a species of grass in the family Poaceae. It is native from Mexico to South America.

References

leucostachyus
Taxonomy articles created by Polbot